Boundary Creek Provincial Park is a provincial park in British Columbia, Canada located south of Greenwood BC in that province's Boundary Country, adjacent to BC Highway 3. The eponymous Boundary Creek flows through the park.

References 

Provincial parks of British Columbia
Boundary Country
1956 establishments in British Columbia